Ompok argestes, is a species of sheatfishes endemic to Sri Lanka.

Description
Male is 14.7 cm in length. It is a demersal species of fish. Four dorsal soft rays and 56–63 anal soft rays. 48–52 vertebrae present. Body and head mottled greyish brown. Predorsal profile convex uniformly. Two pairs of barbels present. Mouth terminal where lower jaw longer than the upper jaw. eyes small and without free orbital margin. There is a hazy black blotch in humeral region. scattered melanophores on Dorsal, pectoral and caudal fins. Anal fin with greyish brown mottling. Pelvic fin hyaline.

References

Siluridae
Freshwater fish of Sri Lanka
Endemic fauna of Sri Lanka
Fish described in 2016